ŠK Petrochema Dubová was a Slovak association football club located in Dubová, formerly of the Slovak Second Football League.

Club history
Dubová's best success in Slovak Football was its participation in the Slovak Cup semi-final (2002/2003) against FK Púchov.

Dissolving and merging
On May 7, 2005 Dubová was merged with FK Sokol Nemecká.

Colors and badge 
Its colors were yellow and blue.

References

Defunct football clubs in Slovakia
Association football clubs disestablished in 2005